Haulerwijk is a village in the municipality of Ooststellingwerf in the east of Friesland, the Netherlands. In 2017, it had a population of around 3,300.

The village was first mentioned in 1844 as Haulerwijk, and means "canal of Haule". Haulerwijk started as a peat colony of the Drachtster Company along the Haulerwijkstervaart which was dug 1756. The Dutch Reformed church dates from 1852. In 1840, Haulerwijk was home to 69 people.

Gallery

References

Geography of Ooststellingwerf
Populated places in Friesland